Archasteridae is a family of starfish found in shallow waters in the tropical Indo-Pacific region. The genus Astropus, previously included in this family, is now included in the genus Archaster with the single species, Astropus longipes (Gray, 1840), being accepted as Archaster lorioli Sukarno & Jangoux, 1977.

The only genus in the family is now Archaster as three subfamilies have now been raised to family status:
Subfamily Benthopectininae accepted as Benthopectinidae
Subfamily Pararchasterinae accepted as Benthopectinidae
Subfamily Plutonasterinae accepted as Astropectinidae

Species
The following species are listed by the World Register of Marine Species:
Archaster angulatus Müller & Troschel, 1842
Archaster lorioli Sukarno & Jangoux, 1977
Archaster typicus Müller & Troschel, 1840

References

 
Asteroidea genera
Monotypic echinoderm genera